John Smith is an English folk guitarist and singer from Devon.
 
He has toured Britain, Europe and America extensively, both solo and with artists such as Iron and Wine, James Yorkston, John Martyn, David Gray, Jools Holland, Gil Scott-Heron and Lisa Hannigan (whose records he also plays on). Smith remains unsigned to any record label, but has released four self-funded albums to date.

After the death of John Martyn, he appeared on a tribute album to Martyn alongside Bombay Bicycle Club, Paolo Nutini, Snow Patrol, Phil Collins and Beth Orton.

His unique guitar style has influenced many artists including James Newton Chadwick and Ben Howard.
In particular Smith uses a variety of open tunings and percussive techniques (especially on the song "Winter").

Discography 
 The Fox and the Monk (2006)
 Map or Direction (2009)
 Eavesdropping (2011)
 Great Lakes (2013)
 Headlong (2017)
 Hummingbird (2018)
 The Fray  (2021)

References

External links
Fan website

Year of birth missing (living people)
Living people
English male singer-songwriters